Olympiahalle is an indoor sports venue located in Innsbruck, Austria. During the 1964 Winter Olympics, it hosted the figure skating and ice hockey events. Twelve years later, at the 1976 Winter Olympics, it again hosted figure skating and ice hockey.

Twelve years later, Olympic competitions were again held at the Olympiahalle. For the 2005 IIHF World Championship, it was renovated and built a smaller ice rink. The capacity is approximately 7,800 spectators at the Olympiahalle in Innsbruck, and approximately 3,200 in the smaller hall, the Tyrolean Ice Arena next door. The smaller hall hosts the HC Innsbruck for its games.

In 2024 it will host the 2024 European Women's Handball Championship.

Concerts
Top acts in the Olympic Hall since 1964: Rolling Stones, Tina Turner, Cher, Dire Straits, Joe Cocker, Nena, Falco, Simply Red, Sting, Rainhard Fendrich, Pink, Marilyn Manson, Iron Maiden, Wolfgang Ambros, Lenny Kravitz, Gianna Nannini, Supertramp, amongst others.

See also
OlympiaWorld Innsbruck
List of indoor arenas in Austria

References
1964 Winter Olympics official report. pp. 66–7. 
1976 Winter Olympics official report. pp. 204–8.

External links

Official website. 

Venues of the 1964 Winter Olympics
Venues of the 1976 Winter Olympics
Venues of the 2012 Winter Youth Olympics
Olympic figure skating venues
Olympic ice hockey venues
Indoor ice hockey venues in Austria
Indoor arenas in Austria
Buildings and structures in Innsbruck
Sports venues completed in 1963
1963 establishments in Austria
20th-century architecture in Austria